The 1974 Singaporean presidential election was held to elect the next president of Singapore Benjamin Sheares was re-elected by the Parliament of Singapore.

Results
The election took place during a sitting of Parliament on 6 November 1974 where 59 members were present and 6 members were absent.

Prime Minister Lee Kuan Yew nominated Benjamin Sheares for a second term as president. Sheares was unanimously re-elected by Parliament as president.

Sheares was sworn in for his second four-year term as president on 2 January 1975.

References

Presidential elections in Singapore
Singapore
Presidential election